Italian Studies in Southern Africa/Studi d’Italianistica nell’Africa Australe is a biannual peer-reviewed academic journal published by the Association of Professional Italianists in South Africa/Associazione di Professori d’Italiano in Sudafrica. It is published in Italian and English and covers the field of Italian studies.

The journal is abstracted and indexed in the MLA International Bibliography, Bibliografia Generale della Lingua e della Letteratura Italiana, and Italinemo. It is listed as a journal qualifying authors for research support by the South African Department of Higher Education and Training and the Australian Research Council.

The editor-in-chief is Anna Meda (University of South Africa).

References

External links
 
 Association of Professional Italianists in South Africa

Multilingual journals
Publications established in 1988
Area studies journals
Biannual journals
Academic journals published by learned and professional societies